There have been two New Brighton Piers in New Brighton, New Zealand. The first pier, of wooden construction, opened on 18 January 1894 and was demolished on 12 October 1965. The current concrete pier was opened on 1 November 1997. It is one of the icons of Christchurch.

First pier

The first pier was built from timber. Construction began in 1891 and it was officially opened by the Governor of New Zealand, the Lord Glasgow, on 18 January 1894. Other dignitaries who attended the opening included the Mayor of Christchurch (Walter Cooper), the Mayor of Linwood (J. R. Brunt), and two members of the House of Representatives (George John Smith and William Whitehouse Collins). It started raining just as the opening ceremony finished, and planned fireworks were postponed. There were plans to build an octagonal end to the pier including a large building, but this was never carried out. Over time, the pier decayed. The city council ordered the pier to be demolished, and this was done during just four and a half hours in the early morning of 12 October 1965 on a receding tide.

Second pier
For 30 years, the New Brighton community rallied for another pier to be built. The Pier and Foreshore Society had campaigned to save the original pier, and the group continued lobbying for a new pier. When NZ$2m had been raised, this was matched by funding from Christchurch City Council and a new pier was designed using reinforced concrete. The new pier was built in exactly the same location, and was officially opened on 1 November 1997. It spans , which makes it the longest ocean pier in Australasia. The New Brighton Pier is held as the icon of New Brighton and later the icon of Christchurch after the 22 February 2011 earthquake that significantly damaged Christchurch's Cathedral. The pier is one of Christchurch's tourist attractions. Currently the New Brighton Pier is the venue of a number of events, such as regular skate on the Pier events and the annual Guy Fawkes fireworks display held on 5 November every year. The pier sustained some damage in the various earthquakes, which was exacerbated in the 2016 Christchurch earthquake. Repairs started in February 2017, took 16 months, and cost NZ$8.5m. New Brighton pier reopened again in May 2018.

References

External links

Christchurch City Libraries: Photographs of New Brighton pier construction

Buildings and structures in Christchurch
Tourist attractions in Christchurch
1894 establishments in New Zealand
1965 disestablishments in New Zealand
1997 establishments in New Zealand
Piers in New Zealand
Transport buildings and structures in Canterbury, New Zealand